Le gorille a bonne mine, written and drawn by Franquin, is the eleventh album of the Spirou et Fantasio series. The title story and Vacances sans histoires (A Quiet Holiday), were serialised in Spirou magazine, before the hardcover album release in 1959.

The title literally means roughly The Gorilla's in Good Shape, but the title is also a pun on the "mine d'or" ("goldmine") which appears in the story.

When Egmont (on its imprint "Euro Books") published this album in English for the Indian market, it was given the title "The Gorilla Gold Adventure".

Story
In Le gorille a bonne mine, Spirou and Fantasio journey to Molomonga in central Africa, on a journalistic expedition to seek out the rare gorillas of Mount Kilimaki. In a setting of uneasy atmosphere amidst questionable characters and unlikely accidents, their efforts become increasingly difficult, justifying the suspicion that someone tries to prevent the reporters from reaching their goal.

In Vacances sans histoires, the heroes take a road-trip south to the French riviera. This leads to an encounter with Ibn-Mah-Zoud, an abundantly wealthy sheikh and allegedly the worst motorcar driver in the world, and who tries out their Turbotraction:Turbot-Rhino I.

Background
During the title story's original serial publication in Spirou, it was named Le gorille à mauvaise mine, but, after previously published La mauvaise tête, the hardcover album was renamed by editors who wanted to avoid establishing a trend of negative names (i.e. The Bad Head, The Bad Expression).

With Vacances sans histoires, this album contains the second Spirou adventure cameo appearance of Gaston Lagaffe, although the first would be released in a later album, Le voyageur du Mésozoïque.

At the end of Vacances sans histoires, the Turbot 2 is revealed for the first time, as a replacement for the Turbotraction wrecked by the Sheik.

References

 Franquin publications in Spirou BDoubliées 
Footnotes

External links
 Spirou official site album index 
 Franquin site album index 

Comics by André Franquin
Spirou et Fantasio albums
1959 graphic novels
1959 in comics
Africa in fiction
Comics set in France
Works originally published in Spirou (magazine)
Literature first published in serial form